Baccaurea latifolia is a species of plant in the family Phyllanthaceae. It is found in Malaysia and Singapore.

References

latifolia
Conservation dependent plants
Taxonomy articles created by Polbot
Taxa named by Joseph Dalton Hooker